Fuxiang Lu Station is a station of Line 2, Suzhou Rail Transit. The station is located in Xiangcheng District of Suzhou. It started service in September 24, 2016, when Line 2 extension started service.

References

Railway stations in Jiangsu
Suzhou Rail Transit stations
Railway stations in China opened in 2016